The 85th Regiment Pennsylvania Volunteer Infantry was an infantry regiment that served in the Union Army during the American Civil War.

Service
The 85th Pennsylvania Infantry was organized at Uniontown, Pennsylvania, beginning October 16, 1861, and mustered in for a three-year enlistment under the command of Colonel Joshua B. Howell.

The regiment was attached to 2nd Brigade, Casey's Division, Army of the Potomac, to March 1862. 2nd Brigade, 3rd Division, IV Corps, Army of the Potomac, to June 1862. 2nd Brigade, 2nd Division, IV Corps, to September 1862. Wessell's Brigade, Division at Suffolk, Virginia, VII Corps, Department of Virginia, to December 1862. 1st Brigade, 1st Division, Department of North Carolina, to January 1863. 2nd Brigade, 3rd Division, XVIII Corps, Department of North Carolina, to February 1863. 2nd Brigade, 2nd Division, XVIII Corps, Department of the South, to April 1863. Folly Island, South Carolina, X Corps, Department of the South, to June 1863. 1st Brigade, Folly Island, South Carolina, X Corps, to July 1863. 1st Brigade, 2nd Division, Morris Island, South Carolina, X Corps, July 1863. 2nd Brigade, Morris Island, South Carolina, X Corps, to October 1863. Howell's Brigade, Gordon's Division, Folly Island, South Carolina, X Corps, to December 1863. District of Hilton Head, South Carolina, X Corps, to April 1864. 1st Brigade, 1st Division, X Corps, Department of Virginia and North Carolina, to November 1864.

The 85th Pennsylvania Infantry mustered out November 22, 1864. Veterans and recruits were transferred to the 188th Pennsylvania Infantry.

Detailed service
Left Pennsylvania for Washington, D.C. Duty in the defenses of Washington, D. C., until March 1862. Advance on Manassas, Va., March 10–15. Moved to the Peninsula March 28. Siege of Yorktown April 5-May 4. Battle of Williamsburg May 5. Reconnaissance to Seven Pines May 24–27. Skirmishes at Seven Pines, Savage Station and Chickahominy May 24. Seven Pines May 29. Battle of Seven Pines, Fair Oaks, May 31-June 1. Seven days before Richmond June 25-July 1. Brackett's June 30. Malvern Hill July 1. At Harrison's Landing until August 16. Moved to Fortress Monroe August 16–23, then to Suffolk September 18, and duty there until December. Reconnaissance to Franklin on the Blackwater October 3. Ordered to New Berne, N.C., December 4. Foster's Expedition to Goldsboro December 10–21. Southwest Creek December 13–14. Kinston December 14. Whitehall December 16. Goldsboro December 17. Duty at New Bern, N.C., until January 1863. Moved to Port Royal, S.C., January 28–31. At St. Helena Island, S.C., until April. At Folly Island, S.C., until July. Attack on Morris Island July 10. Assaults on Fort Wagner, Morris, Island, S.C., July 11 and 18. Siege of Forts Wagner and Gregg, Morris Island, and operations against Fort Sumter and Charleston July 18-September 7. Duty on Morris and Folly Islands operating against Charleston until December. Moved to Hilton Head, S.C., and duty there until April 1864. Expedition to Whitemarsh Island, Ga., February 22. Moved to Gloucester Point, Va., April. Butler's operations on south side of James River and against Petersburg and Richmond May 4–28. Ware Bottom Church May 9. Swift Creek or Arrow field Church May 9–10. Proctor's Creek and operations against Fort Darling May 12–16. Battle of Drewry's Bluff May 14–16. Operations on Bermuda Hundred front May 17–30. Ware Bottom Church May 20. Port Walthal June 16–17. Siege operations against Petersburg and Richmond June 16 to November 22, 1864. Ware Bottom Church June 20. Demonstration on north side of the James at Deep Bottom August 13–20. Strawberry Plains, Deep Bottom, August 14–18. Chaffin's Farm, New Market Heights, September 28–30. Darbytown Road October 7. Battle of Fair Oaks October 27–28.

Casualties
The regiment lost a total of 247 men during service; 7 officers and 90 enlisted men killed or mortally wounded, 4 officers and 146 enlisted men died from disease-related causes.

Commanders
 Colonel Joshua B. Howell
 Major Edward Campbell

Notable members
 Private William E. Leonard, Company F - Medal of Honor recipient for action at the Second Battle of Deep Bottom
 Private Francis Morrison, Company H - Medal of Honor recipient for action during the Bermuda Hundred Campaign
 1st Lieutenant Norman B. Ream, Company H - youngest man to be promoted from private to 1st lieutenant in the Union Army; served on the board of directors of the National Biscuit Company

See also

 List of Pennsylvania Civil War Units
 Pennsylvania in the Civil War

References
 Clendaniel, Dan. Such Hard and Severe Service: The 85th Pennsylvania in the Civil War 2 vols. (Morgantown, WV: Monongahela Books). 2019, 2021.
 Dickey, Luther S. History of the Eighty-Fifth Regiment Pennsylvania Volunteer Infantry, 1861-1865 (New York: J.C. & W.E Powers), 1915.
 Dyer, Frederick H. A Compendium of the War of the Rebellion (Des Moines, IA:  Dyer Pub. Co.), 1908.
 Gordon, Marquis Lafayette. M. L. Gordon's Experiences in the Civil War: From His Narrative, Letters and Diary (Boston: s.n.), 1922.
 Hadden, James. History of the Old Flag of the Eighty-Fifth Regiment Pennsylvania Volunteers, Civil War, 1861-1865 (S.l.: s.n.), 1907.
 McJunkin, Milton. The Bloody 85th: The Letters of Milton McJunkin, a Western Pennsylvania Soldier in the Civil War (Dalesville, VA: Schroeder Publications), 2000. 
Attribution
 

Military units and formations established in 1861
Military units and formations disestablished in 1864
Units and formations of the Union Army from Pennsylvania
1861 establishments in Pennsylvania